Events from the year 1960 in Sweden

Incumbents
 Monarch – Gustaf VI Adolf 
 Prime Minister – Tage Erlander

Events
13 December – The motorway Vätterleden in Sweden is inaugurated.

Births

 27 February – Pär Arvidsson, swimmer.
 12 April – Tomas Jonsson, ice hockey player.
 3 July – Håkan Loob, ice hockey player.
 26 August – Jan Brink, horse rider.

Deaths
 4 February – Carl Björkman, sport shooter (born 1869).
 21 May – Rudolf Degermark, gymnast (born 1886).
 29 June – Karl Lindahl, gymnast (born 1890).
 Signe Bergman, feminist (born 1869).
 Ebba von Eckermann, feminist (born 1866).

References

 
Sweden
Years of the 20th century in Sweden